Zim Zim Falls is a 100+ ft tall waterfall in northern Napa County, California in the Knoxville Wildlife Area. This area is also a part of the much larger Berryessa-Snow Mountain National Monument. The waterfall became accessible to the public in 2005 after the wildlife area was expanded by 12,000 acres. The falls are located along Zim Zim Creek which is a tributary of Eticuera Creek. The water from the falls eventually flows into Lake Berryessa via Eticuera Creek.

References 

Rivers of Napa County, California
Waterfalls of California